Jean-Baptiste Louis Romé de l'Isle (26 August 1736 – 3 July 1790) was a French mineralogist, considered one of the creators of modern crystallography.

Romé was born in Gray, Haute-Saône, in eastern France.  As secretary of a company of artillery in the Carnatic Wars he visited the East Indies, was taken prisoner by the English in 1761, and held in captivity for several years.  He was also an alumnus of the Collège Sainte-Barbe in Paris.

Subsequently, he became distinguished for his researches on mineralogy and crystallography. He was the author of Essai de Cristallographie (1772), the second edition of which, regarded as his principal work, was published as Cristallographie (3 vols. and atlas, 1783).  His formulation of the Law of Constancy of Interfacial Angles built on observations by the geologist Nicolaus Steno.

In 1775, he was elected a foreign member of the Royal Swedish Academy of Sciences.  He died in Paris, France on 3 July 1790.

References

Works

External links 
Romé de L'Isle, Jean-Baptiste Louis de (1736-1790). Des caractères extérieurs des minéraux, ou Réponse à cette question, 1794

1736 births
1790 deaths
Crystallographers
French geologists
French mineralogists
Members of the Royal Swedish Academy of Sciences
Members of the Prussian Academy of Sciences